Parliamentary elections were held in the Republic of the Congo on 2 May 1993, with a second round in several constituencies on 6 June. The result was a victory for the Presidential Tendency coalition, which won 65 of the 125 seats in the National Assembly.

Results

References

Elections in the Republic of the Congo
Election, Parliament
Congo
Election and referendum articles with incomplete results